Reyer Jacobsz van Blommendael (27 June 1628 (baptised) – 23 November 1675) was a Dutch Golden Age painter from Haarlem.

Biography
He entered the Haarlem Guild of that city in 1662, and was buried in the St. Bavochurch there where later his sister Risje (who had previously named him in her will) was also buried. His sister's will from 1669 stated that he was living in Amsterdam, and her newer will from 1675 mentions him living in the Hague.

His works were attributed by Johannes Vermeer, Dirck van Baburen, Cesar van Everdingen, Abraham Bloemaert, Jan van Bronchorst and Gerard van Honthorst.

Works
Paris and Oenone, Palais des Beaux-Arts de Lille
Lot and His Daughters, 
Socrates, his two Wives, and Alcibiades (1660s), Musée des Beaux-Arts de Strasbourg
Saint Bavo Saves Haarlem (1673), St. Bavochurch, Harlem

Notes

References

External link

Year of birth unknown
1675 deaths
Artists from Haarlem
Dutch Golden Age painters
Dutch male painters
Painters from Haarlem